The tiger bent-toed gecko (Cyrtodactylus tigroides) is a species of gecko that is endemic to Thailand.

References 

Cyrtodactylus
Reptiles described in 2003
Taxa named by Aaron M. Bauer
Taxa named by Montri Sumontha
Taxa named by Olivier Sylvain Gérard Pauwels